Foroni is a surname. People with that name include:

 Antonietta Foroni-Conti (1822-187?), Italian operatic soprano
 Domenico Foroni (1796-1853), Italian composer, conductor, and music educator; father of Jacopo Foroni and Antonietta Foroni-Conti
 Jacopo Foroni (1825-1858), Italian composer and conductor; son of Domenico Foroni
 , provincial president of Lega Nord for Lodi (Lombardy)